Jacob Harris Miller (born November 28, 1992) is an American singer, songwriter and rapper. In 2013, Miller released his debut album Us Against Them. In 2016, Miller's 7-song EP titled Overnight was released. He later released his second album, 2:00am in LA, as an independent artist in 2017, followed by his third album Silver Lining in 2018. In 2019, he released the EP Based on a True Story, which he largely produced in his own bedroom.

Life and career
His family is Jewish.

1992–2012: Early life and career beginnings
In May 2011, Miller won the Samsung and T-Mobile USA national "Kick it With the Band" talent competition. As a grand prize winner, Miller was awarded $35,000 to use for his music career as well as a video with YouTube celebrity Keenan Cahill. Afterward he opened for Mac Miller and performed alongside Flo Rida, Sean Kingston, and Asher Roth at the "Think Pink Rocks" concert which benefited breast cancer awareness. In December 2011, Miller performed at the annual Y100 Jingle Ball concert along with Cody Simpson and We the Kings.  Miller partnered with Big Time Rush for the song "Lost In Love" from the album 24/Seven. Miller released his EP Spotlight on July 29, 2012, with the single "What I Wouldn't Give".

2013–2015 Us Against Them, EPs and touring
On January 16, 2013, Miller signed with E1 Music. The single "A Million Lives" was released one week later, and was included on the EP The Road Less Traveled, released on April 9 of that year. On November 5, 2013, Miller released his debut full-length album Us Against Them. Later that month, Miller revealed that he had signed a record deal with Warner Bros. Records.

On July 6, 2014, Miller released the lead single from his third EP Dazed and Confused, called "First Flight Home". On November 4, 2014, Miller released the EP, initially titled Lion Heart, then renamed to Dazed and Confused, due this song being more successful on the charts. It marked his debut with Warner Bros. The EP includes the songs  "Party in the Penthouse", "Lion Heart", along with the lead single, and features with Nikki Flores on "Ghost" and Travie McCoy on "Dazed and Confused". The songs on the renamed EP are the same from the Lion Heart EP. The accompanying tour, titled The Dazed And Confused Tour, began on July 8, 2015, in Sayreville, New Jersey and went on in the US until August 13, 2015. On the same day of the start of the tour, Miller surprisingly announced through his social medias that an EP, called Rumors, would be released later that day, with five new songs. The EP debuted at No. 118 on the Billboard 200 with 8,000 units, the highest selling new album of the week. The 2015 EP Rumors closes with the track "Sunshine" about Miller's childhood friend Dylan Andrew Schopp who had committed suicide in February 2015 at age of 21. A music video was also prepared with proceeds of the single going to the Dylan Schopp Sunshine Foundation and for youth suicide awareness.

2016–2017: Overnight, departure from Warner Bros. Records, and independent releases
On January 19, 2016, Miller announced his new representation with Wilhelmina Models. On July 30, 2016, Miller announced his new 7-Track EP titled Overnight would be released on August 19. The lead single of the same name was released on August 5. On the same day that the album was released, Miller was to begin his support as an act on a portion of the North American leg of Fifth Harmony's The 7/27 Tour until September 13. In December 2016 he was chosen as Elvis Duran's "Artist of the Month", and he performed "Overnight" live on NBC's Today show with Kathie Lee and Hoda Kotb.

On June 5, 2017, Miller revealed the title, artwork, and the release date for his sophomore album titled 2:00am in LA. The album was released on June 16, 2017. Along with the news of the album, he revealed he and Warner Bros. Records had "parted ways".

On February 19, 2018, Miller revealed the title, artwork, and the release date for his upcoming album titled Silver Lining. Preorders began on February 20 at midnight, with one of the tracks, "The Girl That's Underneath", being released. The album was released on March 9, 2018.

2018–present: Record deal with Red Music
On July 27, 2018, Miller announced that he signed a record deal with RED MUSIC, a label division of Sony Music.

On August 2, 2018, Miller was the celebrity guest at the color war breakout at Camp Chen-A-Wanda located in Thompson, Pennsylvania.

On November 15, 2018, Miller released his first major song in five years called "Wait for You".

Discography 

Studio albums
 Us Against Them (2013)
 2:00am in LA (2017)
 Silver Lining (2018)
 Silver Lining II (2021)

Extended plays
 Summer Session (2011)
 Spotlight (2012)
 The Road Less Traveled (2013)
 Dazed and Confused (2014)
 Rumors (2015)
 Overnight (2016)
 2:00am in LA Acoustic (2017)
 Based on a True Story (2019)
 SUMMER 19 (2019)

Tours 
Headlining
 The Miller High Life Tour (2012)
 The Us Against Them Tour (2013)
 The Dazed and Confused Tour (2015)
 The Overnight Tour Europe (2017)
 Back to the Start Tour (2017)
 Hit and Run Tour (2018)
 Wait for You Tour (2019)
 The "Hi, I Missed You" 2021 Tour (2021)
 The 8 Tattoos Tour (2022) 

Co-Headlining
 Whatever USA Tour 2019 (with) Hoodie Allen

Supporting
 Fifth Harmony – The 7/27 Tour (2016)

References

External links 
 

1992 births
American pop musicians
American male singers
American male rappers
Jewish American musicians
Jewish rappers
Living people
People from Weston, Florida
Pop rappers
Rappers from Florida
Southern hip hop musicians
21st-century American rappers
21st-century American male musicians
American contemporary R&B singers
21st-century American Jews